The 1989–90 Scottish Inter-District Championship was a rugby union competition for Scotland's district teams.

This season saw the 36th formal Scottish Inter-District Championship.

Glasgow District won the competition with three wins and one draw.

Preview Glasgow North u21

1989-90 League Table

Results

Round 1

Glasgow District: 

Edinburgh District: 

South of Scotland: 

North and Midlands:

Round 2

Anglo-Scots: 

South of Scotland: 

Edinburgh District: 

North and Midlands:

Round 3

Anglo-Scots: 

Edinburgh District: 

North and Midlands: 

Glasgow District:

Round 4

North and Midlands: 

Anglo-Scots: 

South of Scotland: 

Glasgow District:

Round 5

Glasgow District: 

Anglo-Scots: 

Edinburgh District: 

South of Scotland:

Matches outwith the Championship

Trial matches

Blues: 

Reds:

References

1989–90 in Scottish rugby union
1989–90
Scot